Nader Al-Khateeb (born July 30, 1960) is the General Director of the Water and Environmental Development Organization (WEDO), a non-profit Palestinian organization that promotes a number of environmental programs and projects centered on water quality control, water conservation, wastewater treatment and reuse, as well as solid waste management and recycling. He was also the Palestinian Director of EcoPeace Middle East (formerly Friends of the Earth Middle East (FoEME)). EcoPeace Middle East is a unique regional organization that brings together Jordanian, Palestinian and Israeli environmentalists to promote sustainable development and advance peace efforts in the Middle East. It has offices in Amman, Bethlehem and Tel Aviv, employs 40 paid staff and actively involves hundreds of volunteers. 

In 1983, Nader Al-Khateeb graduated from the Middle East Technical University in Turkey with a B.Sc. in Geological Engineering. He went on to acquire an M.Sc. degree in Environmental Management from the Loughborough University of Technology in the U.K. in 1989. He has since had over 20 years of experience in water management and sanitation.

Mr. Al-Khateeb served as Chief Engineer for the Bethlehem, Beit Jala and Beit Sahour Water Authority from 1984 to 1993, where he was responsible for planning and fundraising, as well as operations and maintenance of the distribution network. After returning from leave to acquire his M.Sc. degree, he also became the Project Manager for their drainage and sewerage project.

From 1994 to 1997, Mr. Al-Khateeb was a senior water resource engineer with the UNDP's Water Resources Action Program, working as a consultant in the effort to formulate and establish the Palestinian Water Authority (PWA). He then became associated with the PWA itself, coordinating a host of water and wastewater projects.

In 1998, he resigned from this role to work with the newly established Water and Environmental Development Organization (WEDO). During this time he also served as a consultant to various international development organizations working in the water sector. He carried out feasibility studies for the industrial waste management sector in Hebron under USAID, worked with UNESCO to prepare a conceptual Emergency Master Plan for the Bethlehem Region and trained municipal engineers in the Gaza Strip on wastewater collection and treatment systems along with the German group Carl Duisberg Gesellschaft (CDG). In 2001, WEDO became the base for the Palestinian branch of Friends of the Earth Middle East (FoEME) and Mr. Al-Khateeb has since served as its Director.

He holds a host of professional memberships with such organizations as the Jordan Engineers Association, Israel/Palestine Center for Research and Information, Palestinian Technical and Advisory Committees on Water for the multilateral negotiations, and the Consultative Training Board established by the German group Carl Duisberg Gesellschaft (CDG) for training Palestinian professionals in the water sector.

Mr. Al-Khateeb is a registered Professional Engineer in the West Bank and a registered Professional Engineer in Amman, Jordan, in the Division of Mining Engineering, Section of Geological Engineering.

Awards
EcoPeace Middle East's three co-directors—Nader Al-Khateeb (Palestine), Gidon Bromberg (Israel) and Munqeth Mehyar (Jordan) -- were honored by TIME Magazine as Heroes of the Environment (2008) and the organization was granted the prestigious Skoll Award in 2009. EcoPeace Middle East also received a 2008 SEED Finalist Award.

Published works
EcoPeace Middle East Reports: co-author
 Environmental Peacebuilding Theory and Practice
 Identifying Common Environmental Problems and Shared Solutions
 Good Water Neighbors
 Municipal Cooperation across Conflict Divides - A Preliminary Study
 Nature, Agriculture and the Price of Water in Israel
 Economic Valuation of Resuscitating the Dead Sea
 Advancing Conservation and Sustainable Development of the Dead Sea Basin - Broadening the Debate on Economic and Management Issues
 Let the Dead Sea Live
 Dead Sea Challenges
 One Basin - One Strategy
 Jordan River Peace Park Pre Feasibility Study
 How Past Trans-boundary Security Arrangements Can Change the Future of Peace Parks in the Tri-partite Region
 FoEME Report on the Proposed Red Dead Conduit
 Red Sea-Dead Sea Conduit - Geo-Environmental Study Along the Arava Valley
 A Seeping Time Bomb: Pollution of the Mountain Aquifer by Solid Waste

For more, see Publications tab on FoEME website

References

External links
 EcoPeace Middle East
 TIME Magazine Environmental Heroes 2008 article
 Water and Environmental Development Organization (WEDO)
 Jordan Engineers Association (Arabic)
 Israel-Palestine Center for Research and Information

Video Clips on EcoPeace Middle East Projects
 Good Water Neighbors and youth - "Green Mideast Peace"
 FoEME Eco-Park in the Zeiglab Basin, Jordan Valley
 Gidon Bromberg on the Jordan River Peace Park
 Gidon Bromberg on the Good Water Neighbors Project

1960 births
Living people
Alumni of Loughborough University